Soveyseh-ye Saleh (also Romanized as Soveyseh-ye Şāleḩ; also known as Savaiseh, Soveyseh, and Soveyseh-ye Chahār) is a village in Soveyseh Rural District, in the Soveyseh District of Karun County, Khuzestan Province, Iran. At the 2006 census, its population was 781, in 132 families.

References 

Populated places in Karun County